Heikki Veli Nieminen (1 December 1886 – 1 April 1936) was a Finnish gymnast and sports shooter, who won two bronzes competing in the 1908, 1920 and 1924 Summer Olympics.

Sport 

He also participated the ISSF World Shooting Championships twice:
 1924: free rifle, kneeling: 5th
 1928: free rifle, prone: 17th

He won the Finnish championship in 150 metre free rifle standing in 1925.

He was the secretary of Finnish Shooting Sport Federation in 1927–1936 and a board member in 1919–1933.

Politics 

He was among the leadership in the Mäntsälä rebellion. He was prosecuted for the rebellion but acquitted.

He was developing the party platform and organisation for the Patriotic People's Movement.

He sat in the Hämeenlinna municipal council in 1934–1936.

References

1886 births
1936 deaths
Finnish male artistic gymnasts
Finnish male sport shooters
ISSF rifle shooters
Gymnasts at the 1908 Summer Olympics
Shooters at the 1920 Summer Olympics
Shooters at the 1924 Summer Olympics
Olympic shooters of Finland
Olympic gymnasts of Finland
Olympic bronze medalists for Finland
Olympic medalists in gymnastics
Olympic medalists in shooting
Medalists at the 1908 Summer Olympics
Medalists at the 1920 Summer Olympics